Abdulrahman Al Faihan (born 24 June 1986) is a Kuwaiti sport shooter who competed in the Men's Trap Shooting competition in the 2016 Summer Olympics. He participated within the Independent Olympic Athletes team.

Career
In January 2016 he won a gold medal and an Olympic quota place while competing under the ISSF flag at the 2016 Asian Olympic Qualifying Tournament in New Delhi, India. The IOC had imposed a suspension on the Kuwait Olympic Committee in October 2015 as a result of legislation brought in by the Kuwaiti government that could have affected the autonomy of sporting organizations in the country.

References

External links
 

Living people
1986 births
Olympic shooters of Kuwait
Shooters at the 2016 Summer Olympics
Olympic shooters as Independent Olympic Participants
Shooters at the 2006 Asian Games
Shooters at the 2010 Asian Games
Shooters at the 2014 Asian Games
Shooters at the 2018 Asian Games
Asian Games gold medalists for Kuwait
Asian Games silver medalists for Kuwait
Asian Games medalists in shooting
Medalists at the 2006 Asian Games
Medalists at the 2010 Asian Games
Medalists at the 2014 Asian Games
Kuwaiti male sport shooters
Trap and double trap shooters
Shooters at the 2020 Summer Olympics
Islamic Solidarity Games competitors for Kuwait